Morgenthau is a German surname meaning "morning dew". Notable people with the surname include:

Elinor Morgenthau (1891–1949), American Democratic party activist
Hans Morgenthau (1904–1980), German-born international relations theorist
Henry Morgenthau Sr. (1856–1946), American diplomat and businessman
Henry Morgenthau Jr. (1891–1967), United States Secretary of the Treasury and proponent of the Morgenthau Plan
Robert M. Morgenthau (1919–2019), American lawyer
Henry Morgenthau III (1917–2018) American author and television producer
Kramer Morgenthau (1966–) American cinematographer

In popular culture 
Some fictional characters with this surname are:
Karl Morgenthau
Karli Morgenthau

See also 
Morgenthau Lectures, named after Hans Morgenthau
Ambassador Morgenthau's Story (1918), published memoirs of Henry Morgenthau Sr.
Morgenthau Report, a report issued by the United States' commission led by Henry Morgenthau Sr.
USCGC Morgenthau (WHEC-722), a U.S. Coast Guard cutter
Morgenthau Plan, a plan for the occupation of Germany after World War II.
Morgenthau Family Tree" (PDF). Museum of Jewish Heritage. Retrieved 2015-07-16.
Kestenbaum, Lawrence. "The Political Graveyard: Morgenthau-Lehman family of New York". The Political Graveyard. Retrieved 2015-07-16.
Morgenthau, Henry. Mostly Morgenthaus: A Family History. New York, NY: Ticknor & Fields. 

German-language surnames
Jewish surnames
Yiddish-language surnames